Kunjaban is a census town in West Tripura district in the Indian state of Tripura.

Demographics
At the 2001 India census, Kunjaban had a population of 7352. Males constituted 59% of the population and females 41%. Kunjaban had an average literacy rate of 79%, higher than the national average of 59.5%: male literacy was 85%, and female literacy was 69%. In Kunjaban, 10% of the population was under 6 years of age.

References

Cities and towns in West Tripura district
West Tripura district